The Animal in You is a 1995 non-fiction book by Roy Feinson, which posits a biological basis as to why people tend to exhibit personality traits similar to animal species. The book hypothesizes that through the process of convergent evolution, people adopt a niche set of behaviors enabling them to cope with their particular social milieu in the same way as individual animal species adapt to their environments. The book has been translated into ten different languages, including Mandarin, Japanese, Czech, Hebrew and French, and has been featured on CNN, The Dr. Phil Show and CBS The Talk

The Personality Test
The Animal in You features a personality test of nine questions that collapses to one of 45 possible personality types. After readers answer the questions about their personality and physical attributes, the test returns a number corresponding to one of the 45 animal personality types, appearing in a look-up table. The underlying mechanisms for these types of tests are trivial for modern software based Internet tests, but this is the first known example of a book-based test able to resolve over 20 categories. The test is augmented by an interdependent weighting scheme wherein each question is assigned a different weight depending on how the other questions are answered.

The Animals
The animal personalities are broken down into the broad categories shown below.

Carnivores 
Traits:
Powerful, Optimistic, Territorial, Courageous, Fastidious, Athletic, Adventurous, Energetic, Attractive, Fun, Loving, Talented, Flamboyant, World Travelers, Loyal
 Otter 
 Wolf
 Sea Lion
 Wild Dog
 Walrus
 Lion
 Shark
 Tiger
 Bear
 Fox
 Wild Cat
 Badger
 Weasel
 Dog.

Optimistic

Herbivores 
Traits:
Sociable, Hard Working, Sober, Friendly, Family Oriented, Organized, Reliable, Methodical, Conservative
 Baboon
 Elephant
 Bison
 Giraffe
 Cottontail
 Gorilla
 Deer
 Rhinoceros
 Hippo
 Sable
 Horse
 Sheep
 Mountain Goat
 Warthog
 Zebra.

Rodents & Insectivores 
Traits:
Small, Creative, Thrifty, Active, Resilient, Cautious, Socially, loving, Bright
 Mole
 Bat
 Porcupine
 Beaver
 Prairie Dog
 Shrew
 Mouse

Birds 
Traits:
Energetic, Attractive, Fun-Loving, Talented, Flamboyant, World Travelers
 Penguin
 Eagle
 Rooster
 Owl
 Swan
 Peacock
 Vulture

Reptiles 
Traits:
Artistic Creative Quick Tempered Moody Quirky Unpredictable
 Crocodile
 Snake

Animal Attraction
"Animal Attraction" was a sequel to "Animal In You," published by St. Martin's Griffin Press in 1999. This book explored the types relationships suggested by the different personality types.

Citations in Academic Articles
Pets and People: Companions in Commerce? Holbrook.

Advances in Business Marketing and Purchasing.  Wallpach, Woodside.
 
Are Birds of a Feather Flocking to the Beach?  Black.

References

External links
 The book's website was one of the earliest comprehensive personality tests available on the web and receives over 

South African non-fiction books
American non-fiction books
Ethology
Works about personality